Ingólfr Arnarson, in some sources named Bjǫrnólfsson, ( – )
is commonly recognized as the first permanent Norse settler of Iceland, together with his wife  and foster brother Hjörleifr Hróðmarsson. According to tradition, they settled in Reykjavík in 874.

Biography
Ingólfr Arnarson was from the valley of Rivedal in Sunnfjord in western Norway. According to the Icelandic Book of Settlements, he built his homestead in and gave name to Reykjavík in 874.  However, archaeological finds in Iceland suggest settlement may have started somewhat earlier.  The medieval chronicler Ari Þorgilsson said Ingólfr was the first Nordic settler in Iceland, but mentioned that Irish monks had been in the country before the Norsemen. He wrote that they left because they did not want to live among  the newly arrived Norse pagans.

The Book of Settlements (written two to three centuries after the settlement) contains a story about Ingólfr's arrival. The book claims he left Norway after becoming involved in a blood feud. He had heard about a new island which Garðar Svavarsson, Hrafna-Flóki and others had found in the Atlantic Ocean. With his blood brother Hjörleifr Hróðmarsson, he sailed for Iceland. When land was in sight, he threw his high seat pillars overboard and promised to settle where the gods decided to bring them ashore. Two of his slaves then searched the coasts for three years before finding the pillars in the small bay which eventually became the site of  Reykjavík.

In the meantime, Hjörleifr had been murdered by his Irish slaves. Ingólfr hunted them down and killed them in the Westman Islands. The islands got their name from that event, with westmen (Old Norse: vestmenn) being a name that the Norsemen used for the Irish. Ingólfr was said to have settled a large part of southwestern Iceland, although after his settlement nothing more was known of him. It was a forerunner of the Althingi.

Legacy

In 1924, a statue of Ingólfr Arnarson, designed by Icelandic sculptor Einar Jónsson (1874–1954), was erected in Reykjavík. A copy of the statue was erected at Rivedal in 1961.

See also
 Settlement of Iceland
 Viking expansion

Notes

References

External links
Statue of Ingolfur Arnarson

Viking explorers
9th-century Norwegian people
9th-century Icelandic people
9th-century explorers
910 deaths
9th-century Vikings